Carole Lazare, sometimes credited as Carol Lazare, is a former Canadian film and television actress who was prominent in the 1970s. She is most noted for her role in the film One Man, for which she won the Canadian Film Award for Best Supporting Actress in 1977.

She also appeared in the films The Megantic Outlaw, Lies My Father Told Me, and The Fly, and in guest roles in the television series The Starlost, King of Kensington and Matt and Jenny.

She was later a writer for the erotic television series Bliss.

References

External links

Canadian film actresses
Canadian television actresses
Canadian television writers
Living people
Best Supporting Actress Genie and Canadian Screen Award winners
20th-century Canadian actresses
Canadian women television writers
Year of birth missing (living people)